Mark Christian Colón is an American attorney and housing official who is a former nominee to be an Assistant Secretary for Community Planning and Development.

Early life and education 

Colón received his Bachelor of Arts from Hunter College and his Juris Doctor from Yale Law School, where he was managing editor of the Yale Law & Policy Review.

Career 
Following law school, he was a law clerk for Judge Julio M. Fuentes of the United States Court of Appeals for the Third Circuit. He later practiced law at Simpson Thacher & Bartlett and Dechert LLP.

Until 2020, he was the president of the Office of Housing Preservation at New York State Homes and Community Renewal (HCR). In this capacity, he oversaw one of the largest, most diverse affordable housing portfolios in the country, with more than 450,000 units in 3,200 developments across New York. Previously, Colón served as HCR's acting "Disaster Recovery" Counsel, helping to lead post-Hurricane Sandy housing recovery efforts.

Colón is the chairperson of El Puente de Williamsburg and a board member of the Institute for Energy Economics and Financial Analysis (IEEFA).

On April 27, 2021, President Joe Biden announced Colón to be the nominee to serve as assistant secretary for community planning and development. On April 28, 2021, his nomination was sent to the United States Senate. His tweets were a focus of his Senate confirmation hearing. On January 3, 2022, his nomination was returned to the president.

Personal life 

He is a native New Yorker and lives in Brooklyn with his wife, Gina Kim, and their 14-year-old son.

References

Living people
21st-century American lawyers
Hunter College alumni
New York (state) lawyers
People from New York (state)
Yale Law School alumni
Year of birth missing (living people)